Debra Laefer is the Director of Citizen Science program within NYU's Center for Urban Science + Progress and Associate Professor of NYU's Tandon School of Engineering. Previously a professor at University College, Dublin, her research in geotechnical and structural engineering focuses on ways to preserve architecturally significant buildings from sub-surface construction.

Laefer leads the Urban Modelling Group which released the densest LiDAR dataset to date in order to facilitate urban development. She was also featured in a showcase of eight leading female scientists of Ireland in an exhibition in 2016.

Laefer earned her PhD from the University of Illinois at Urbana-Champaign in Geotechnical Civil Engineering.  She holds a B.A. in Art History and a B.S. in Civil Engineering from Columbia University. She is a fellow of the Japan Society for the Promotion of Science and a Fulbright fellow.

References 

New York University faculty
Columbia School of Engineering and Applied Science alumni
Year of birth missing (living people)
Living people
Grainger College of Engineering alumni
Academics of University College Dublin
American women scientists
American women academics
21st-century American women